Elmar Schmid (born 1947 in Binn, Switzerland) is a Swiss clarinetist.
He studied in Zurich with Professors Marcel Wahlich, Hansjörg Leuthold and, in Berlin, with Karl Leister.

He was Professor of Clarinet and Chamber Music at the Zurich School of Music where he also carried out an intense professional artistic activity. Many recordings give proof of his interest in chamber music for clarinet.

He specialises in New Music and original Folkloric music. He is musical Director of the 'Oberwalliser Spillit' ensemble, for which the composer Heinz Holliger has written 'Alb Cher'. In 1999, Jürg Wittenbach dedicated to this musical ensemble his composition 'Gragantua chez les Helvètes du Haut-Wallais' (Scenes on Rabelais).
He was a part of Collegium Novum Zürich.

He is  married to the clarinetist Sabine Gertschen; they have two children.

External links
1 Recordings with Elmar Schmid in the catalog of the 
 Bayerische Staatsbibliothek BSB

2 Recording with Elmar Schmid for label Jecklin 1986, Jecklin Disco-587-2

3 Recording with Elmar Schmid, Musik für Klarinette und Bassetthorn, 1987

References

1947 births
Living people
Swiss music educators
Swiss clarinetists
Swiss male musicians
21st-century clarinetists
21st-century male musicians